Jan Zapletal may refer to:

 Jan Zapletal (archer) (born 1994),  Czech recurve archer
 Jan Zapletal (ice hockey) (born 1986), Czech ice hockey player